The Piawi languages are a small family of Papuan languages spoken in the Schraeder Range of the Madang Highlands of Papua New Guinea that had been part of Stephen Wurm's Trans–New Guinea proposal. They are now connected to the Arafundi and Madang languages.

The name "Piawi" is an acronym of three language varieties: Pinai (Pinaye), Aramo/Aramaue (Hagahai) and Wiyaw (Harway/Waibuk). Pinai and Hagahai are often classified as a single language.

Classification
Piawi consists of only two languages:

 Piawi family: Pinai-Hagahai, Haruai (Waibuk)

Davies and Comrie (1985) noted some pronominal similarities with the Engan languages in Trans–New Guinea, which Ross took into consideration, but no lexical similarities. Comrie believes the family is as isolate. William A. Foley suggested that Piawi and Arafundi may be related (Comrie 1992), and according to Ross a connection with Arafundi or Ramu appears more promising than Engan. Timothy Usher confirms the link to Arafundi.

Pronouns
Below is a comparison of proto-Piawi, proto-Ramu, Arafundi, and proto-North Engan pronouns, per Ross. Initial nasals are ubiquitous, and indeed are very common throughout New Guinea, so they are in themselves not good evidence of a relationship.

Both Engan and Piawi have a dual suffix *li.

Vocabulary comparison
The following basic vocabulary words are from Davies & Comrie (1985), as cited in the Trans-New Guinea database. The Haruai data is from Tonson (1976).

See also
Upper Yuat languages

References

External links
Piawi languages database at TransNewGuinea.org

 
Upper Yuat languages
Languages of Madang Province